The Catholic Theological Society of America (CTSA) is a professional association of Catholic theologians founded in 1946 to promote studies and research in theology within the Catholic tradition. Its members are primarily in the United States and Canada.

Role and activities
The CTSA provides a forum for the exchange of ideas relating to theology, problems, and how to develop a more effective educational approach. The society also tries to foster within the Christian community a better understanding of their faith. It advances its work through annual June conventions, scholarly publications and committees that work throughout the year. The John Courtney Murray Award is the highest honour bestowed by the Catholic Theological Society of America, named after a theologian known for his work on religious liberty.

Several members of the society have been criticized by the Holy See's Congregation for the Doctrine of the Faith or US Bishops' Conference Committee on Doctrine, including Roger Haight, Richard McBrien, Elizabeth Johnson, Peter Phan, Margaret Farley. and Charles Curran.

An internal report of the society, dated May 15, 2013, and released in October of that year, stated:

Women's ordination 
In response to Ordinatio sacerdotalis, the Catholic Theological Society of America set up a task force to study the question. The task force produced a report, "Tradition and the Ordination of Women", which said that Ordinatio sacerdotalis is mistaken with regard to its claims on the authority of this teaching and its grounds in Tradition.

Presidents
The following have served as President of the Catholic Theological Society of America:

Francis J. Connell (1946–1947)
James E. O'Connell (1947–1948)
Eugene M. Burke (1948–1949)
Gerard Kelly (1949–1950)
John J. Galvin (1950–1951)
Edmond D. Bernard (1951–1952)
John M. A. Fearns (1952–1953)
Gerard Yelle (1953–1954)
William R. O'Connor (1954–1955)
Augustine P. Hennessy (1955–1956)
George W. Shea (1956–1957)
John F. X. Sweeney (1957–1958)
Michael J. Murphy (1958–1959)
Lawrence J. Riley (1959–1960)
Thomas W. Coyle 1960–1961)
Aloysius McDonough (1961–1962)
Ferrer Smith (1962–1963)
Richard T. Doherty (1963–1964)
Gerald Van Ackeren (1964–1965)
Eamon R. Carroll (1965–1966)
Paul E. McKeever (1966–1967)
Walter J. Burghardt (1967–1968)
Austin B. Vaughan (1968–1969)
Charles E. Curran (1969–1970)
Richard A. McCormick (1970–1971)
Carl J. Peter (1971–1972)
John H. Wright (1972–1973)
Richard P. McBrien (1973–1974)
Luke Salm (1974–1975)
Avery Dulles (1975–1976)
David W. Tracy (1976–1977)
Agnes Cunningham (1977–1978)
Kenan B. Osborne (1978–1979)
William J. Hill (1979–1980)
Thomas F. O'Meara (1980–1981)
Leo J. O'Donovan (1981–1982)
Bernard J. Cooke (1982–1983)
Michael Fahey (1983–1984)
Patrick Granfield (1984–1985)
Francis S. Fiorenza (1985–1986)
Monika Hellwig (1986–1987)
Michael J. Scanlon (1987–1988)
John P. Boyle (1988–1989)
Anne E. Patrick (1989–1990)
Walter H. Principe (1990–1991)
Michael J. Buckley (1991–1992)
Lisa Sowle Cahill (1992–1993)
Gerard S. Sloyan (1993–1994)
Roger Haight (1994–1995)
Elizabeth Johnson (1995–1996)
William Thompson-Uberuaga (1996–1997)
Mary Ann Donovan (1997–1998)
Robert Schreiter (1998–1999)
Margaret Farley (1999–2000)
Kenneth R. Himes (2000–2001)
Peter Phan (2001–2002)
Jon Nilson (2002–2003)
M. Shawn Copeland (2003–2004)
Roberto S. Goizueta (2004–2005)
Mary Catherine Hilkert (2005–2006)
Daniel Finn (2006–2007)
Margaret O'Gara (2007–2008)
Terrence W. Tilley (2008–2009)
Bryan N. Massingale (2009–2010)
Mary Ann Hinsdale (2010–2011)
John E. Thiel (2011–2012)
Susan A. Ross (2012–2013)
Richard Gaillardetz (2013–2014)
Susan K. Wood (2014–2015)
Bradford E. Hinze (2015–2016)
David Hollenbach (2016–2017)
Mary E. Hines (2017–2018)
Paul Lakeland (2018–2019)
Maria Pilar Aquino (2019–2020 & 2020-2021)
Christine Firer Hinze (2021–2022)

References

External links
 Official website

Catholic lay organisations
Catholic theology and doctrine
Christian organizations established in 1946
Ordination of women and the Catholic Church
Theological societies